David Blair Motorsports (DBM) is a former NASCAR Winston Cup team. It was formed in 1995 by attorney David Blair. It only ran a few years in the circuit, and never could hang onto a regular sponsor.

1996 
David Blair Motorsports began racing in 1996, the No. 27 team having been acquired in its entirety from Junior Johnson & Associates. It was able to keep the number, 27, and the driver, Elton Sawyer. Sawyer and the team got off to a disappointing start, failing to qualify for two races and only mustering up a best finish of 19th at the spring Atlanta race. After the Coca-Cola 600, Sawyer was released due to a lack of funding for the operation, and the team suspended operations to reorganize. After a failed attempt at the Brickyard 400 with Jason Keller driving, DBM reappeared at the Mountain Dew Southern 500 with Todd Bodine driving. Bodine qualified sixteenth and finished 15th. Bodine ran two more races with the team that season, never qualifying outside the top 20.

1997 
After starting 1997 off with no driver or sponsor, the team finally hooked up a deal with Rick Wilson to run selected events that season. The team returned at the Miller 400 at Michigan, where Wilson started 31st and finished 21st. He had the same finish later in the year at the Brickyard 400 in a car sponsored by the Indianapolis Colts. In September that year, Blair was hired by Robert Yates Racing to field a car for their new driver, Kenny Irwin Jr., to prepare him for his rookie year in 1998. In his first start with the team at Richmond International Raceway, Irwin qualified on the outside pole. He followed that up with taking the lead at lap 86 and holding it for the next 12 laps before finishing in eighth place. In his next start, at Martinsville Speedway, he qualified third but had to make an early exit due to a fuel pump problem. He ran two more races that year before moving to RYR full-time for 1998.

1998 
DBM began 1998 in a familiar place: no sponsor. Despite signing Tommy Kendall to drive early on, the team was unable to locate a sponsor for the year, and Kendall left the team. This did not stop the team from looking towards the future, as they built a full shop of Ford Tauruses to prepare for a full-time run. A successful test at Darlington Speedway with Mike Wallace yielded optimism for 1999, but by November, it was obvious the situation hadn't gotten any better. As a result, Blair laid off all of his employees and sold the shop and equipment to Travis Carter Motorsports. Under the TCM banner, the old David Blair team ran for five years with mediocre results, before disappearing in 2003.

References

1996 establishments in North Carolina
1998 disestablishments in North Carolina
Companies based in North Carolina
Defunct NASCAR teams
American auto racing teams
Defunct companies based in North Carolina